Transnational Corporation plc (or Transcorp Group), is a diversified conglomerate with strategic investments and core interests in the hospitality, agribusiness and energy sectors. A publicly quoted conglomerate with a diversified shareholders base of about 290,000 investors, its notable assets include Transcorp Hotels plc (Transcorp Hilton Hotel, Abuja and Transcorp Hotels, Calabar); Transcorp Ughelli Power Limited and Transcorp Energy Limited (operator of OPL 281).

Origin
Transnational Corporation Plc was incorporated on 16 November 2004. The original concept was that Transcorp would be a conglomerate, similar to the South Korean chaebol conglomerates.

Transcorp's Businesses
Transcorp Hilton Hotel, Abuja – a 670-room 4-star hotel.
Transcorp Hotels, Calabar – a 146-room destination hotel located in the city of Calabar, Cross River State, Nigeria.
Teragro Commodities Limited – the agribusiness subsidiary, operator of the Teragro Benfruit Plant, Benue State, Nigeria. Teragro Limited runs a juice concentrate plant in the Middle Belt area of Nigeria as a result of the available agricultural raw materials.
Transcorp Energy Limited – established in 2008 for upstream petroleum exploration, operator of OPL 281. It is a fully owned subsidiary of Transcorp.
Transcorp Power Limited (TPL) – the owner and operator of the Ughelli Power Plant which was privatized by the Nigerian government along with other Nigerian power plants. The plant has an installed capacity of 1000MW. The plant is located in Delta State and had an available capacity of 480 MW as of November 2015. TUPL has made full payment of $300million for the plant.

Acquisitions
The Hilton Hotel, Abuja: In December 2005, Transcorp acquired 51% controlling stake in the Hilton Abuja for the sum of $105 million (equivalent at the time to N13.7billion) after a very competitive bid. The remaining 49% is owned by the Bureau of Public Enterprise (BPE).
Rumens Road: Transcorp acquired Rumens Road Apartments at 1 Rumens Road, Ikoyi, Lagos in 2005 for N377m.
Oil Blocs: Transcorp acquired two oil blocs in the May 2006 bidding round, consolidated in one oil bloc, OPL 281. Ownership of the OPL 281 oil bloc, which had previously been revoked by the Department of Petroleum Resources, was returned to Transcorp in February 2011 after the payment of the balance of the signature bonus. Transcorp is partnering with Equity Energy Resources (EER), and pan-African energy company SAC-Oil Holdings of South Africa, to take equity and provide resources that will bring the oil bloc into operation.
Metropolitan Hotel, Calabar: Transcorp acquired the 146-room Metropolitan Hotel in Calabar (now re-branded Transcorp Hotels Calabar) in June 2010.
Benfruits Plant: On 29 November 2010, Transcorp signed a lease agreement with the Benue State Government for the Benfruits juice concentrate plant in Markurdi, Benue State.
Ughelli Power Plant: On 25 September 2012, Transcorp Ughelli Power Limited (TUPL) won the $300 million bid for the acquisition of the Ughelli Power Plant, one of the six power generation companies of the Power Holding Company of Nigeria (PHCN) being privatised by the Federal Government of Nigeria. The Ughelli plant is a thermal power generating plant located in Delta State, Nigeria with installed capacity of 1000MW but currently producing 330MW which accounts for 8% of Nigeria's total power generation. TUPL met the 25 percent deposit deadline by paying the sum of US$75million to the BPE on March 20, 2013 and on 21 August 2013, TUPL made payment to the BPE of $225million, representing 75 percent of the $300 million bid price for the 1000 megawatt capacity Ughelli Power Plant. On November 1, 2013, the Federal Government of Nigeria officially handed over the plant to Transcorp Ughelli Power Limited.

Recent Partnerships
On 30 January 2013, Transnational Corporation of Nigeria plc and General Electric (GE) signed a framework agreement to collaborate to address the infrastructural needs of Nigeria, with emphasis on the power and transportation sectors specifically rail transportation. GE, a global leader in the design, manufacture, supply, installation and maintenance of technology and services for the power sector, confirmed its commitment to facilitate the generation of 10,000MW of additional power in Nigeria over the next decade in line with its existing agreement with the Federal Government of Nigeria, signed in March 2012.

External links
 Transcorp Group Corporate Website

References

Conglomerate companies of Nigeria
Companies based in Lagos